Aetna is an unincorporated community in Marion County, Tennessee, United States. It lies at an elevation of 1696 feet (517 m). Aetna was named after the Sicilian volcano, Mount Etna.

References

Unincorporated communities in Marion County, Tennessee
Unincorporated communities in Tennessee